Jerry Don Thompson (born November 21, 1942) is Regents Professor of History at Texas A&M International University in Laredo, Texas. He is a prolific author of books on a variety of related topics, specializing in the American Civil War, the history of the Southwestern United States, and Texas history. According to WorldCat, two of his books are available from more than six hundred major libraries worldwide  – Confederate General of the West: Henry Hopkins Sibley, and Civil War in the Southwest: Recollections of the Sibley Brigade.

Background

Thompson was born to Jerry W. Thompson, Jr. (1920–2010), and Jo Thompson (1917–1982) in Springerville in Apache County in eastern Arizona, but he was reared in the unincorporated community of Quemado in Catron County in western New Mexico. He holds a Doctor of Arts degree in history from Carnegie Mellon University in Pittsburgh, Pennsylvania, a Master of Arts in history from the University of New Mexico at Albuquerque, and a Bachelor of Arts in History from Western New Mexico University in Silver City. Thompson has served in the past as Dean of the College of Arts and Humanities at Texas A&M International and Chairperson of the Division of Behavioral and Social Sciences at the Laredo Community College, when that institution was still named Laredo Junior College. It is now Laredo College.

Career

In 2001, Thompson was named Regents Professor of History by the Texas A&M University System Board of Regents. He has received numerous awards in recognition of his scholarship, including the Minnie Stevens Piper Fellowship; T.R. Fehrenback Award, by the Texas Historical Commission; Kate Broocks Bates Award, by the Texas State Historical Association; Gaspar Perez de Villagra Award, by the Historical Society of New Mexico; and Barry Goldwater Award, by the Arizona Historical Society.

In 2008, his book Cortina: Defending the Mexican Name in Texas won the Texas Institute of Letters award for "Best Scholarly Book." Thompson won over sixteen other nominees. The book is a biography of controversial Mexican revolutionary, bandit, and folk hero Juan Cortina (1824–1894). Thompson told the Laredo Morning Times that he did not seek to portray Cortina as an heroic figure because "he was a very flawed individual, but I tried to be objective and tell the truth." With records on Cortina scattered from Laredo to Mexico City to Yale University, Thompson spent twenty years on the project.

In 1861, Cortina, nominally loyal to the Union, confronted Confederate States of America Colonel Santos Benavides in a battle in Zapata. Because Cortina lacked the resources to fight, Benavides decisively defeated him. As Thompson studied both men, he concluded that Cortina "completely overshadowed Benavides", for whom a Laredo elementary school is named.

In November 2008, Thompson elaborated further on his book before a group of United South High School students in Laredo: "Cortina defended people who were unable to defend themselves. There is so little written about him, but he is the only person in history to have a war named after him." While Cortina defeated the Texas Rangers, the U.S. Army thereafter subdued him. Thompson noted that little is included about Cortina in history books because "history is written by the winners."

Other Thompson works are Civil War in the Southwest, A Wild and Vivid Land: An Illustrated History of the South Texas Border, and Into the Far, Wild Country: True Tales of the Old Southwest.

Thompson is a former president of the Texas State Historical Association. In the fall of 2017, Thompson offered a continuing education non-credit weekly class, "The History of Laredo," which will consist of field trips, guest speakers, and lectures."

Recent works
2023 Under the Pinon Tree: Finding a Place in Pie Town (University of New Mexico Press

2020 (With Harwood P. Hinton), Courage Above all Things: General John Ellis Wool and the American Military, 1812-1863, Norman, University of Oklahoma Press)

2019 Wrecked Lives and Lost Souls; Joe Lynch Davis and the Last of the Oklahoma Outlaws, Norman, University of Oklahoma Press

2017 Tejano Tiger: Jose de los Santos Benavides and the Texas-Mexico Borderlands, 1823-1891, Fort Worth, Texas Christian University Press

2016 A Civil War History of the New Mexico Militia and Volunteers, University of New Mexico Press, Albuquerque.
2011 Ed., Tejanos in Gray: The Civil War Letters of Captains Rafael de la Garza and Manuel Yturri, Texas A&M University Press, College Station.

2008 ed., New Mexico Territory During the Civil War: Wallen and Evans Inspection Reports, 1862-1863, University of New Mexico Press, Albuquerque

Ed. (with Thomas T. Smith and Robert Wooster), The Reminiscences of Major General Zenas R. Bliss, 1854-1876, Texas State Historical Association, Austin.

Bibliography

References

External links
 

1942 births
Living people
Texas A&M International University faculty
People from Laredo, Texas
People from Catron County, New Mexico
University of New Mexico alumni
Carnegie Mellon University alumni
Western New Mexico University alumni
Historians of the American West
21st-century American historians
Historians of Texas
Texas Democrats
People from Springerville, Arizona
Historians from Texas
Historians from New Mexico
Historians from Arizona
20th-century American historians
American male non-fiction writers
20th-century American male writers
21st-century American male writers